Structural testing is the evaluation of an object (which might be an assembly of objects) to ascertain its characteristics of physical strength.  Testing includes evaluating compressive strength, shear strength, tensile strength, all of which may be conducted to failure or to some satisfactory margin of safety.  Evaluations may also be indirect, using techniques such as x-ray  ultrasound, and ground-penetrating radar, among others, to assess the quality of the object.

Structural engineers conduct structural testing to evaluate material suitability for a particular application and to evaluate the capacity of existing structures to withstand foreseeable loads.

Items may include buildings (or components), bridges, airplane wings or other types of structures.

See also
Structural analysis
Structural load

References

Structural engineering
Product testing